The 2018 United States Senate election in Hawaii took place on November 6, 2018. Incumbent Democratic U.S. Senator Mazie Hirono ran for reelection to a second term. Hirono ran unopposed in her party's primary and was easily reelected, defeating Republican challenger Ron Curtis. She won the highest vote percentage of any U.S. Senate candidate in 2018.

The primary election took place on August 11, 2018.

Democratic primary

Candidates

Declared
 Mazie Hirono, incumbent U.S. Senator

Declined
 Tulsi Gabbard, U.S. Representative

Endorsements

Results

Republican primary

Candidates

Declared
 Consuelo Anderson, educator and businesswoman
 George L. Berish, former Honolulu Symphony board member and finance chair
 Ron Curtis, retired systems engineer
 Rocky De La Fuente, businessman
 Robert C. Helsham Sr.
 Michael R. Hodgkiss
 Eddie Pirkowski, CEO
 Thomas Edward White

Results

Nonpartisan primary

Candidates

Declared
 Charles (Charlie) Haverty
 Matthew K. Maertens
 Arturo Pacheco Reyes

Notes

Results

General election

Predictions
There were no polls taken, and the race was rated safely Democratic by all forecasters.

Results

References

External links
Candidates at Vote Smart 
Candidates at Ballotpedia 
Campaign finance at FEC 
Campaign finance at OpenSecrets

Official campaign websites
Ron Curtis (R) for Senate
Mazie Hirono (D) for Senate

2018
Hawaii
United States Senate
November 2018 events in Oceania